Harry Ralph Tollefson (April 12, 1891 – September 24, 1947) was an American football and basketball coach. He served as the head football coach at Kearney State Normal College—now known as the University of Nebraska–Kearney—from 1914 to 1916, compiling a record of 10–10–1. Tollefson was also the head basketball coach at Kearney State from 1914 to 1917, tallying a mark of 11–22.

Head coaching record

Football

References

External links
 

1891 births
1947 deaths
Nebraska–Kearney Lopers football coaches
Nebraska–Kearney Lopers men's basketball coaches